The Coleman Hawkins, Roy Eldridge, Pete Brown, Jo Jones All Stars at Newport is a live album by Coleman Hawkins's All Stars with Roy Eldridge, Pete Brown and Jo Jones recorded at the Newport Jazz Festival in 1957 and released on the Verve label.

Reception

The Allmusic site awarded the album 3 stars.

Track listing
 "I Can't Believe That You're in Love with Me" (Jimmy McHugh, Clarence Gaskill) - 13:52
 "Day by Day" (Axel Stordahl, Paul Weston, Sammy Cahn) - 4:25
 "Embraceable You" (George Gershwin, Ira Gershwin) - 2:20
 "Moonglow" (Will Hudson, Irving Mills, Eddie DeLange) - 2:45
 "Sweet Georgia Brown" (Ben Bernie, Maceo Pinkard, Kenneth Casey) - 13:51

Personnel
Coleman Hawkins - tenor saxophone (tracks 1, 4 & 5)
Roy Eldridge - trumpet (tracks 1, 3 & 4), drums (track 5) 
Pete Brown - alto saxophone (tracks 1, 2, 4 & 5)
Ray Bryant - piano
Al McKibbon - bass
Jo Jones - drums

References

Verve Records live albums
Coleman Hawkins live albums
Roy Eldridge live albums
Albums recorded at the Newport Jazz Festival
1957 live albums
Albums produced by Norman Granz